Anablepsoides is a genus of killifish in the family Rivulidae native to tropical South America and the Lesser Antilles. The majority are from the Amazon and Orinoco basins, as well as freshwater systems in the Guiana Shield, but a few species are from northern Venezuela, northeastern Brazil (Tocantins River basin, as well as systems in Ceará and Maranhão) and the Lesser Antilles (Trinidad and Tobago, Grenada, Martinique and Margarita). Although largely restricted to lowlands, a few species occur in the lower East Andean foothills. They are mostly found in shallow fresh water swamps, streams, edges of rivers, ponds and pools, but a few may occur in brackish estuaries. They are able to jump over land and breathe air for short periods, allowing them to access isolated waters inhabited by few or no other fish. Several Anablepsoides species have small distributions and some are seriously threatened by habitat loss; the entire known range of A. xinguensis is in the area flooded by the Belo Monte Dam.

Similar to closely related genera such as Atlantirivulus, Cynodonichthys, Laimosemion and Melanorivulus, Anablepsoides are non-annual killifish.

Species
Until 2011, Anablepsoides were included in Rivulus, and some prefer to maintain them in that genus.

If recognized as a valid genus, there are currently 56 species in Anablepsoides:

 Anablepsoides amanan (W. J. E. M. Costa & Lazzarotto, 2008)
 Anablepsoides amphoreus (Huber, 1979)
 Anablepsoides atratus (Garman, 1895)
 Anablepsoides bahianus (Huber, 1990)
 Anablepsoides beniensis (G. S. Myers, 1927)
 Anablepsoides bondi (L. P. Schultz, 1949)
 Anablepsoides cajariensis (W. J. E. M. Costa & de Luca, 2011)
 Anablepsoides caurae (Radda, 2004)
 Anablepsoides cearensis (W. J. E. M. Costa & Vono, 2009)
 Anablepsoides chapare Valdesalici (sv) & García-Gil, 2017
 Anablepsoides christinae (Huber, 1992)
 Anablepsoides corpulentus (Thomerson & Taphorn, 1993)
 Anablepsoides cryptocallus (Seegers, 1980)
 Anablepsoides deltaphilus (Seegers, 1983)
 Anablepsoides derhami (Fels & Huber, 1985)
 Anablepsoides elongatus (Fels & de Rham, 1981)
 Anablepsoides erberi (Berkenkamp, 1989)
 Anablepsoides fransvermeuleni Valdesalici (sv), 2015
 Anablepsoides gamae W. J. E. M. Costa, Bragança & Amorim, 2013
 Anablepsoides gaucheri (Keith, Nandrin & Le Bail, 2006)
 Anablepsoides hartii (Boulenger, 1890) 
 Anablepsoides henschelae W. J. E. M. Costa, Bragança & Amorim, 2013
 Anablepsoides hoetmeri D. T. B. Nielsen, Baptista & van der Berg, 2016
 Anablepsoides holmiae (C. H. Eigenmann, 1909)
 Anablepsoides igneus (Huber, 1991)
 Anablepsoides immaculatus (Thomerson, Nico & Taphorn, 1991)
 Anablepsoides intermittens (Fels & de Rham, 1981)
 Anablepsoides iridescens (Fels & de Rham, 1981)
 Anablepsoides jari W. J. E. M. Costa, Bragança & Amorim, 2013
 Anablepsoides jucundus (Huber, 1992)
 Anablepsoides lanceolatus (C. H. Eigenmann, 1909)
 Anablepsoides limoncochae (Hoedeman, 1962)
 Anablepsoides lineasoppilatae Valdesalici (sv) & I. Schindler, 2013
 Anablepsoides luitalimae D. T. B. Nielsen, 2016
 Anablepsoides lungi (Berkenkamp, 1984)
 Anablepsoides mazaruni (G. S. Myers, 1924)
 Anablepsoides micropus (Steindachner, 1863)
 Anablepsoides monticola (Staeck & I. Schindler, 1997)
 Anablepsoides ophiomimus (Huber, 1992)
 Anablepsoides ornatus (Garman, 1895)
 Anablepsoides ottonii W. J. E. M. Costa, Bragança & Amorim, 2013
 Anablepsoides parlettei (Valdesalici (sv) & I. Schindler, 2011)
 Anablepsoides peruanus (Regan, 1903)
 Anablepsoides roraima W. J. E. M. Costa, Bragança & Amorim, 2013
 Anablepsoides rubrolineatus (Fels & de Rham, 1981)
 Anablepsoides speciosus (Fels & de Rham, 1981)
 Anablepsoides stagnatus (C. H. Eigenmann, 1909)
 Anablepsoides taeniatus (Fowler, 1945)
 Anablepsoides tessellatus (Huber, 1992)
 Anablepsoides tocantinensis (W. J. E. M. Costa, 2010) 
 Anablepsoides urophthalmus (Günther, 1866)
 Anablepsoides urubuiensis W. J. E. M. Costa, 2013
 Anablepsoides vieirai D. T. B. Nielsen, 2016
 Anablepsoides waimacui (C. H. Eigenmann, 1909)
 Anablepsoides xanthonotus (C. G. E. Ahl, 1926)
 Anablepsoides xinguensis (W. J. E. M. Costa, 2010)

References

Rivulidae
Fish of South America
Freshwater fish genera